This is a list of episodes from 2016 for the Stuff You Should Know podcast.

2016 season

References

External links 
 Podcast Archive

Lists of radio series episodes